The Montenegrin Basketball Cup is an annual cup competition for Montenegrin basketball teams held since 2007.

History

Montenegrin clubs in Yugoslav Cup

Before the Montenegrin independence in 2006, clubs from Montenegro played in national Cup of Yugoslavia. Most successful was KK Budućnost with three trophies won.

First time, Budućnost won the trophy at final-four 1996 in Nikšić, defeating KK Partizan (126–115) in the final. Two years later, Budućnost won the final four, again in Nikšić (final match against KK Beobanka - 78:71). Last title of Yugoslav Cup winner, Budućnost gained in Vršac (2001) against KK Partizan (87–72).

Below is a list of Yugoslav Cup trophies won by Montenegrin clubs.

Montenegrin Cup (2006–present)
Except Montenegrin Basketball League as a top-tier league competition, after the independence, the Basketball Federation of Montenegro established Montenegrin Cup as a second elite national tournament. Inaugural season of Montenegrin Cup was 2006-07, and by now all the titles are won by Budućnost, except the season 2012-13, when KK Sutjeska surprisingly won the title in Montenegrin Derby.

Winners and finals

Season by season
Below is a list of final matches of Montenegrin Cup since the 2006–07 season.

Trophies by team

Montenegrin Cup
Below is a list of clubs with trophies won in Montenegrin Cup (2006 onwards).

Overall
Below is an overall list, including titles won in both national Cups - the Montenegrin Cup and the FR Yugoslavia / Serbia and Montenegro Cup.

See also
 Montenegrin Basketball League
 Second Basketball League
 Montenegrin Women's Basketball Cup

References

External links
Official website
Profile at eurobasket.com

   
Basketball cup competitions in Montenegro
Basketball cup competitions in Europe
2006 establishments in Montenegro